Duck Creek is a stream in the U.S. state of Missouri. It is a tributary of Barker Creek.

Duck Creek was named for the wild ducks in the area.

See also
List of rivers of Missouri

References

Rivers of Benton County, Missouri
Rivers of Henry County, Missouri
Rivers of Missouri